Symbolyst is the third LP by American post-rock band Lymbyc Systym, released on September 18, 2012. On July 31, 2012, the song "Prairie School" was uploaded to SoundCloud by the band's label.

Track listing

References

2012 albums
Lymbyc Systym albums
Post-rock albums by American artists